Neolioxantho is a genus of crabs in the family Xanthidae, containing the following species:

 Neolioxantho asterodactylus Garth & Kim, 1983
 Neolioxantho latifrons Rathbun, 1911

References

Xanthoidea